Ampiroxicam (INN) is a non-steroidal anti-inflammatory drug (NSAID). It is a prodrug of piroxicam.

References

Dermatoxins
Nonsteroidal anti-inflammatory drugs
Prodrugs
2-Pyridyl compounds
Benzothiazines
Ethers